Arben is an Albanian masculine given name that refers to the first Albanian entity during the Middle Ages: Principality of Arbanon.
Arben Arbëri (born 1964), Albanian football player
Arben Biba (born 1976), Kosovar Albanian actor
Arben Imami (born 1958), Albanian politician
Arben Malaj (born 1961), Albanian politician
Arben Minga (1959–2007), Albanian footballer
Arben Ristani (born 1969), head of the Central Election Commission of Albania
Arben Shehu (born 1980), Albanian football striker
Arben Xhaferi (1948–2012), Albanian politician who worked in the Republic of Macedonia

See also
Arben Broci High School, Tirana, Albania

Albanian masculine given names